Crawford Township is one of twelve townships in Buchanan County, Missouri, USA.  As of the 2010 census, its population was 914.

Crawford Township was organized in the late 1830s, and named after William Crawford.

Geography
It contains seven cemeteries: Antioch, Judy, Richardson, Turner, Union, Williams and Willis.

Transportation
Crawford Township contains one airport or landing strip, Farris Strip Airport.

References

External links
 US-Counties.com
 City-Data.com
 USGS Geographic Names Information System (GNIS)

Townships in Buchanan County, Missouri
Townships in Missouri